The Richmond Hill House was a historic home located at 45 Richmond Hill Rd. in Asheville, North Carolina.  It was built in 1889 and was designed by James G. Hill in the Queen Anne style.  The house sat on a  property.  It was demolished on February 1, 2012.

It was listed on the National Register of Historic Places in 1977.

References

External links
 Richmond Hill House -- Asheville, North Carolina: A National Register of Historic Places Tour Itinerary

Houses on the National Register of Historic Places in North Carolina
Queen Anne architecture in North Carolina
Houses completed in 1889
Houses in Asheville, North Carolina
National Register of Historic Places in Buncombe County, North Carolina